The Best of Ball, Barber & Bilk is a compilation album consisting of tracks by British trumpeter Kenny Ball, trombone player Chris Barber and clarinetist and band leader Acker Bilk. The album reached number 1 in the UK, spending two non-consecutive weeks at the top in 1962. The album contains 4 tracks by each artist. It was later issued on CD on the Hallmark label.

Track listing
Acker Bilk & His Paramount Jazz Band - Jump In The Line
Acker Bilk & His Paramount Jazz Band - Higher Ground
Acker Bilk & His Paramount Jazz Band - Willie The Weeper
Acker Bilk & His Paramount Jazz Band - Gladiolus Rag
Kenny Ball & His Jazzmen - Teddy Bears' Picnic
Kenny Ball & His Jazzmen - Hawaiian War Chant
Kenny Ball & His Jazzmen - I Love You Samantha
Kenny Ball & His Jazzmen - Chimes Blues
Chris Barber & His Jazz Band - Majorca
Chris Barber & His Jazz Band - High Society
Chris Barber & His Jazz Band - Tuxedo Rag
Chris Barber & His Jazz Band - When The Saints Go Marching In

References

1962 albums